Meteura cervina is a moth of the subfamily Arctiinae. It was described by Thomas Pennington Lucas in 1890. It is found in Australia, where it is known from south-eastern Queensland.

References

Lithosiini
Moths described in 1890